Multyfarnham or Fearbranagh is a townland in County Westmeath, Ireland.

Multyfarnham or Fearbranagh spans two civil parishes; it is one of 11 townlands of the civil parish of Stonehall and one of 12 townlands of the civil parish of Tyfarnham, both  in the barony of Corkaree in the Province of Leinster.

The neighbouring townlands are: Lismalady and Multyfarnham to the north, Killintown to the east, Culleenabohoge and Tyfarnham to the south and Ballindurrow and Rathganny to the west.

In the 1911 census of Ireland there were 5 houses and 9 inhabitants in the townland.

References

External links
Map of Multyfarnham or Fearbranagh at openstreetmap.org
 Multyfarnham or Fearbranagh Townland, Stonehall civil parish at the IreAtlas Townland Data Base
Multyfarnham or Fearbranagh Townland, Tyfarnham civil parish at the IreAtlas Townland Data Base
Multyfarnham or Fearbranagh at Townlands.ie
Multyfarnham or Fearbranagh at The Placenames Database of Ireland

Townlands of County Westmeath